{{DISPLAYTITLE:Nav1.4}}

Sodium channel protein type 4 subunit alpha is a protein that in humans is encoded by the SCN4A gene.

The Nav1.4  voltage-gated sodium channel is encoded by the  gene.  Mutations in the gene are associated with hypokalemic periodic paralysis, hyperkalemic periodic paralysis, paramyotonia congenita, and potassium-aggravated myotonia.

Function
Voltage-gated sodium channels are transmembrane glycoprotein complexes composed of a large alpha subunit with 24 transmembrane domains and one or more regulatory beta subunits. They are responsible for the generation and propagation of action potentials in neurons and muscle. This gene encodes one member of the sodium channel alpha subunit gene family. It is expressed in skeletal muscle, and mutations in this gene have been linked to several myotonia and periodic paralysis disorders.

Clinical significance

Periodic paralysis
In hypokalemic periodic paralysis, arginine residues making up the voltage sensor of Nav1.4 are mutated. The voltage sensor comprises the S4 alpha helix of each of the four transmembrane domains (I-IV) of the protein, and contains basic residues that only allow entry of the positive sodium ions at appropriate membrane voltages by blocking or opening the channel pore. In patients with these mutations, the channel has a reduced excitability and signals from the central nervous system are unable to depolarise muscle. As a result, the muscle cannot contract efficiently, causing paralysis. The condition is hypokalemic because a low extracellular potassium ion concentration will cause the muscle to repolarise to the resting potential more quickly, so even if calcium conductance does occur it cannot be sustained. It becomes more difficult to reach the calcium threshold at which the muscle can contract, and even if this is reached then the muscle is more likely to relax. Because of this, the severity would be reduced if potassium ion concentrations are kept high.

In hyperkalemic periodic paralysis, mutations occur in residues between transmembrane domains III and IV which make up the fast inactivation gate of Nav1.4. Mutations have also been found on the cytoplasmic loops between the S4 and S5 helices of domains II, III and IV, which are the binding sites of the inactivation gate.

In patients with these the channel is unable to inactivate, sodium conductance is sustained and the muscle remains permanently tense. Since the motor end plate is depolarized, further signals to contract have no effect (paralysis). The condition is hyperkalemic because a high extracellular potassium ion concentration will make it even more unfavourable for potassium to leave the cell in order to repolarise it to the resting potential, and this further prolongs the sodium conductance and keeps the muscle contracted. Hence, the severity would be reduced if extracellular (serum) potassium ion concentrations are kept low.

Myotonia
The same types of mutations cause myotonia and paralysis, however the difference between these phenotypes depends on the level of sodium current that persists. If the conductance fluctuates below the voltage threshold for Nav1.4, then the sodium channels will eventually be able to close, and be depolarised again. Thus, the muscle merely remains contracted for longer than normal (myotonia) but will relax and be able to contract again within a short period. If the conductance settles at a steady state with the sodium pore open and unable to inactivate, then the muscle is unable to relax at all and motor control is completely lost (paralysis).

References

Further reading

Electrophysiology
Sodium channels